Calzolari is an Italian surname. Notable people with the surname include:

Alfonso Calzolari (1887–1983), Italian cyclist
Pier Ugo Calzolari (1938–2012), Italian engineer
Silvio Calzolari, Italian tug of war competitor
Umberto Calzolari (1938–2018), Italian baseball player

Italian-language surnames